A list of films produced in Spain in 1950 (see 1950 in film).

1950

References

External links
 Spanish films of 1950 at the Internet Movie Database

1950
Spanish
Films